The men's single sculls competition at the 1976 Summer Olympics took place at Notre Dame Island Olympic Basin, Canada. The event was held from 18 to 25 July. There were 15 competitors from 15 nations, with each nation limited to a single boat in the event. The event was won by Pertti Karppinen of Finland, the nation's first medal in the men's single sculls. Karppinen would go on to win three consecutive golds in the event, matching the Soviet Union's Vyacheslav Ivanov who did the same from 1956 to 1964. Silver went to Peter-Michael Kolbe of West Germany; East Germany took its second consecutive bronze medal in the event, this time with Joachim Dreifke as the rower.

Background

This was the 17th appearance of the event. Rowing had been on the programme in 1896 but was cancelled due to bad weather. The single sculls has been held every time that rowing has been contested, beginning in 1900.

Two of the 18 single scullers from the 1972 Games returned: fifth-place finisher Jim Dietz of the United States and seventh-place finisher Seán Drea of Ireland. The two men had each won a silver medal at the World Championships since then (Dietz in 1974 and Drea in 1975), as that event moved from a quadrennial tournament to an annual one; Drea had also won three Diamond Challenge Sculls victories. The reigning World Champion was Peter-Michael Kolbe of West Germany. Kolbe was favored, though Drea was a significant challenger, as was 1975 Pan American champion Ricardo Ibarra of Argentina. 

No nations made their debut in the event. The United States made its 14th appearance, tying the absent Great Britain for most among nations.

Competition format

This rowing event was a single scull event, meaning that each boat was propelled by a single rower. The "scull" portion means that the rower used two oars, one on each side of the boat. The course used the 2000 metres distance that became the Olympic standard in 1912. 

The tournament used the four-round format (three main rounds and a repechage) that had been used since 1968. The competition continued to use the six-boat heat standardised in 1960 as well as the "B" final for ranking 7th through 12th place introduced in 1964.

 Quarterfinals: Three heats of 5 boats each. The top three boats in each heat (9 total) advanced directly to the semifinals. The remaining boats (6 total) went to the repechage.
 Repechage: One heat of 6 boats. The top three boats rejoined the quarterfinal winners in the semifinals. The other boats (3 total) were eliminated.
 Semifinals: Two heats of 6 boats each. The top three boats in each heat (6 total) advanced to Final A, the remaining boats (6 total) went to Final B.
 Final: Two finals. Final A consisted of the top 6 boats. Final B placed boats 7 through 12.

Schedule

All times are Eastern Daylight Time (UTC-4)

Results

Quarterfinals

The three fastest rowers in each heat advanced to the semifinals. The remaining rowers competed in the repechage for the remaining spots in the semifinals.

Quarterfinal 1

Quarterfinal 2

Quarterfinal 3

Repechage

The three fastest rowers in the repechage advanced to the semifinals.

Semifinals
Three fastest rowers in each semi-final advanced to the Final A, while the others to the Final B.

Semifinal 1

Semifinal 2

Finals

Final B

Final A

Results summary

References

Sources

Rowing at the 1976 Summer Olympics
Men's events at the 1976 Summer Olympics